Mendax may refer to:
 Mendax (gastropod), a genus of very small sea snails
 Julian Assange, who used the handle Mendax in his youth as a hacker